Romantic Moments is a compilation album by Greek keyboardist and composer Yanni. It was released on February 17, 1992 by  BMG label.

Track listing

References

External links
Official Website

Yanni albums
1992 compilation albums